Carlo Emanuele Ferrario (born 20 November 1986) is an Italian footballer who plays as a forward for the Serie D club Varese.

Career
Born in Porlezza, Lombardy, Ferrario was signed by Lombard and Serie A club Milan in 1999–2000 season. In 2005, he left for Lecco in co-ownership deal. In summer 2006 he left for Chievo in another co-ownership deal (for a peppercorn fee of €1,000) and Chievo bought him outright in 2007 after he was loaned to Varese along with David Silva Fernandes. In summer 2007 he left for Prato in another co-ownership deal, along with Lorenzo Cecchi, which Prato bought him outright in June 2009.

In July 2010, he was signed by Monza, and he returned in 2016.

On 27 January 2012 he joined Cuneo after failed to score any goal in 2011–12 season.

On 3 September 2020 he signed a 2-year contract with Giana Erminio.

On 31 August 2021, he signed for Serie D club Sangiuliano City.

Honours

Club 
 Monza
Serie D: 2016-17

References

External links
 
 Football.it Profile 
  
 

1986 births
Living people
Sportspeople from Como
Footballers from Lombardy
Italian footballers
Association football forwards
Serie C players
Serie D players
A.C. Milan players
Calcio Lecco 1912 players
S.S.D. Varese Calcio players
A.C. Prato players
A.C. Monza players
A.C. Cuneo 1905 players
A.C. Bra players
S.E.F. Torres 1903 players
U.S. Pergolettese 1932 players
Modena F.C. players
A.S. Giana Erminio players
F.C. Sangiuliano City players
A.S.D. Città di Varese players